Debre Zebit (Amharic: ደብረ ዘቢጥ) is a village in northern Ethiopia. The Central Statistical Agency has not published an estimate for this village's 2005 population. It is one of three towns in Meket woreda.

History

20th Century
Debre Zebit was the location of the Battle of Anchem, on 31 March 1930 between (then) Ras Tafari's forces under the command of Dejazmach Mulugeta Yeggazu (which consisted of 20,000 riflemen with 6 cannons and about 30 machine guns) over those of Ras Gugsa Welle (consisting of 10,000 riflemen with 2 cannons and about 10 machine guns). Ras Gugsa was defeated and killed.

21st Century

Tigray War
During the Tigray War, around 15 August 2021, the Tigray Defense Forces were in control of the town for some days.

Notes 

Populated places in the Amhara Region